The Cordillera de Merida páramo (NT1004) is an ecoregion containing páramo (high moorland) vegetation above the treeline in the Andes mountain range of Venezuela.
The isolated habitat has many endemic species. It is relatively stable and intact.

Geography

Location

The Cordillera de Merida páramo is to the south of the Lake Maracaibo in the Cordillera de Mérida massif of northeastern Venezuela.
It is surrounded by the Venezuelan Andes montane forests ecoregion.

Terrain

Climate

The Köppen climate classification is "ETH": Alpine tundra, with no month with an average temperature in excess of 10 °C (50 °F).
Where the Northern Andean páramo is generally humid throughout the year with moisture delivered in the form of rain, clouds and fog as air masses are lifted up over the mountains, the Cordillera de Merida páramo is similar to the Costa Rican páramo and Santa Marta páramo, where the trade winds create a distinct dry season.
The dominant winds blow northwest from the Amazon region, with a rainy season from around March to November.

Ecology

The Cordillera de Merida páramo ecoregion is in the neotropical realm, in the montane grasslands and shrublands biome.
The ecoregion is part of the Northern Andean Paramo global ecoregion, which also includes the Cordillera Central páramo, Santa Marta páramo and Northern Andean páramo terrestrial ecoregions.
The plants and animals are adapted to the cold, dry conditions of the high peaks.
There is a high level of local endemism, particularly on the more isolated peaks.

Origins

The Andes began to rise in the Miocene epoch, but in the north did not reach their present height until the Pliocene during a period of strong volcanic activity between four and five million years ago.
This was the period when land rose above the tree line and the protopáramo vegetation was formed with new species of the Poaceae, Cyperecear, Arteraceae, Ericaceae and other families. 
During the later parts of the Quaternary epoch a series of short, cold and dry glacial periods alternated with warmer and more humid interglacial periods.
The páramo belts moved lower and joined together in the cold periods, and moved higher into unconnected enclaves when the temperatures rose.

The result is a mix of species of tropical and boreal origin with the same genera found in most páramos, but with many endemic species in the individual páramos.
The Cordillera de Mérida is the oldest part of the northern Andes, and has a large connected corridor of páramo.
The range is probably where most of the páramo flora of tropical origin developed, then migrated south into Colombia during cold glacial periods.

Flora

Above  the páramos are replaced by a periglacial zone with very little vegetation, mostly lichens, mosses and some dwarf plants.
The ecoregion mostly consists of dry páramo habitat, with high-altitude tussock grass, stands of dwarf bamboo and open meadows
There are also some marshes and bogs, although less than in the wet páramo.

Fauna

Redonda chiquinquirana, a butterfly whose females have limited ability to fly, is endemic to the ecoregion.
A study of Carabid beetles found diverse and numerous specimens, all endemic to the ecoregion although closely related to species in other ranges.
The most important Carabid tribes in terms of numbers of species and of individuals belong to the genera Dyscolus and Bembidion.
Endangered amphibians include the Mucubaji stubfoot toad (Atelopus mucubajiensis) and Tamá harlequin frog (Atelopus tamaense).
Endangered mammals include Musso's fish-eating rat (Neusticomys mussoi).

Status

The World Wildlife Fund gives the ecoregion the status "Relatively Stable/Intact".
Protected areas include the Guaramacal National Park.
The Sierra La Culata National Park and Sierra Nevada National Park protect the Ruta de los Páramos, a tourist route through the central páramos.

Notes

Sources

Neotropical ecoregions
Ecoregions of Venezuela
Páramos